Rascher is a surname. Notable people with the surname include:

 Sigurd Raschèr (1907–2001), American saxophonist born in Germany
 Sigmund Rascher (1909–1945), German SS doctor
 Michael Rascher (born 1965), Canadian rower
 Horst Rascher (born 1940), German boxer